Chances is an Australian prime time soap opera which aired from 29 January 1991 to 30 December 1992 on Nine Network. The show was initially pitched by production company Beyond International, as a straightforward drama revolving around a middle-class family whose lives are transformed when they win $3 million in the lottery. However, the network requested raunchier, more erotic storylines in the vein of Number 96 and The Box, with contractually-obligated nudity and sex scenes. Later episodes diverged considerably from the show's original premise, with increasingly bizarre plots involving man-eating plants, devil worshippers and neo-Nazi cults.

The show has developed a cult following.

Series history

Development
Chances was first made as a two-hour pilot in 1988, which remained unseen until the show's 2021 DVD release. With the exception of The Flying Doctors (1986-1993), the Nine Network had suffered a solid decade of soap opera flops that had failed to build an audience, including Taurus Rising (1982), Waterloo Station (1983), Starting Out (1983), Kings (1983), Possession (1985) and Prime Time (1986). As such, Chances was shelved in 1989, however after the network's latest soap attempt, Family and Friends (1990), was cancelled after just eight months, Chances was given the green light.

Production
The series was produced by Beyond International whose only previous successful works had been the program Beyond 2000. Production moved from Sydney to Melbourne, at the network studios  Richmond, Victoria and some roles were recast due to the unavailability of the original actors. John Sheerin and Brenda Addie (replacing Diane Craig from the pilot) starred as 
Dan and Barbara Taylor, who win the lottery and begin sharing their wealth with their children, friends, parents and siblings. 

The series that cost $11,000.00 per episode to produce was recording losses, however the company, keen to get a stranglehold in the industry, continued producing the series despite their ill fortune.
 
The cast includes Jeremy Sims as their mischievous son Alex (replacing Marcus Graham, who left to star in E Street on Network Ten), Natalie McCurry and Cathy Godbold as their daughters Rebecca and Nicki (replacing Mouche Phillips), Tim Robertson as Dan's brother Jack (replacing Warwick Moss), Anne Grigg as his unhappy wife Sarah, Rhys Muldoon and Leverne McDonnell as their free-spirited hairdresser son Ben (replacing Christopher Stollery) and police officer daughter Philippa, Deborah Kennedy as Dan's divorced sister Connie (replacing Sandy Gore), Mark Kounnas and Simon Grey as her sons, Chris and Sam Reynolds, Mercia Deane-Johns as Dan's vivacious hairdresser sister Sharon, Yvonne Lawley as Barbara's mother Heather and Michael Caton as Bill Anderson, Dan's best friend who smokes marijuana to ease the pain of injuries sustained in the Vietnam war.

Early episodes

Chances originally aired on Tuesday and Thursday evenings from 8:30pm. The pilot episode dealt with the build up to Rebecca's wedding to David Young (Rodney Bell), which ended with his shocking death in a car crash. As the family dealt with the fallout, they are interrupted with the announcement that Dan and Barbara had won the lottery. In a contentious bid to try and help ensure the program's success, network executives requested sex scenes and other risqué elements to be added to the series, which creator Lynn Bayonas was initially opposed to. The raunchier premise went ahead, which the initial publicity surrounding the series capitalised on.

The show was a modest success on its premiere night (with the first two episodes aired a two-hour special), however subsequent ratings proved disappointing. Early storylines included the return of Eddie Reynolds (Dennis Miller), Connie's estranged husband, which ends in his murder; the breakdown of Jack and Sarah's marriage, which leads to Sarah seducing her sexually confused nephew, Chris, causing a family scandal; police constable Philippa's illicit relationship with bent cop Geoff Bradbury (Gary Day) and his subsequent murder; her new house mate, eco-warrior, Charlie Gibson (Kimberley Davenport), who becomes pregnant to either Alex or Ben. The standard soap storylines were interspersed with randomly inserted seduction sequences, usually involving Alex, which filled the network quota of nudity and sex. Actor Jeremy Sims described the show as "Home and Away with the odd cutaway of some tits". As the ratings floundered, the writers ramped up the drama with the revelation that Alex's father was Jack, not Dan. As the repercussions of that bombshell settled, an explosion on The Sail Away yacht sees Dan and Bill lost at sea. Bill is found but tells Connie he believes Dan is dead, which Barbara overhears. Shell-shocked, she wanders into the grounds of the hospital car park. Jack runs outside after her when both are hit by a speeding car. They end up in hospital with serious injuries, while Dan is found alive and well, washed up on a beach.

Revamp
This dramatic attempt to save the show didn't work, and after six months of poor ratings, the show's budget was cut and production halved to one hour a week on Tuesdays at 9:30pm. Starting with episode 61, which aired 27 August 1991, the show was jumped ahead by twelve months, and the next 16 episodes explored Alex's "missing" year with help from Paris (Annie Jones), a mysterious beautician who takes "Dan Mitchell" under her wing and helps him uncover the truth about his real identity. Episodes became self-contained and had individual titles, while most of the original seventeen cast members were written out one by one. First to go were the peripheral characters, Heather and Phillipa were both written out before the cutback and given exit storylines, while Sarah and Charlie disappeared entirely. Connie and her sons were demoted to recurring characters, before moving to an Italian ski resort after Chris fell in love with his widowed stepmother Cheryl (Kristen Lyons); Rebecca married politician Steve Harland (Peter Kowitz) and left after a lavish wedding ceremony, while Nicki left for modelling school. Guest actors were hired in short, provocative story arcs, including Lynda Stoner, Kate Fitzpatrick, Christine Harris, Tiffany Lamb, Liz Burch, Neill Gladwin and Briony Behets in an aggressive attempt to boost the ratings further. The sexual elements now involving bondage and lesbianism often in a mystical or fantastical setting, provoked considerable controversy among conservative viewers, with some television watchdogs attacking the show as "teleporn".

Later episodes
When Chances returned for its second season on 26 February 1992 at episode 79, only six of the original cast members remained; Barbara, Dan, Jack, Bill, Sharon, and Alex, who became the show's top-billed star with most storylines revolving around him and the intrigues of his new advertising agency, Inspirations. His partner at the agency, sultry and sarcastic Angela Sullivan (Patsy Stephen), who'd appeared from the second episode and become a regular after the time-jump, was promoted to second lead.

Several new actors were brought into the regular cast, including Molly Brumm as the devious party girl Stephanie Ryan, Gerard Sont as pool boy and jewel thief Cal Lawrence, Ciri Thompson as the manipulative Imogen Lander, Karen Richards as photographer Madeline Wolf, Abigail as television sex expert Bambi Chute, Laurence Mah as mobster Bogart Lo, Katherine Li as Lilly Lo, Stephen Whittaker as advertising agent Sean Beckett, Danielle Fairclough as the ditzy Wanda Starcross. By this stage, the storyline straddled a fine line between reality and fantasy, however with the departures of Dan and Barbara in episode 111, the show went completely off the rails with episodes involving man-eating plants, devil worshippers, Israeli secret agents, ghosts, laser-wielding vampires, Asian Triads, a scantily-clad angel on a Harley Davidson motorcycle, and neo-Nazis hunting valuable Third Reich artifacts (in Melbourne). The aforementioned artifact, the "Eva Braun necklace", turns its wearer into an Egyptian Sun Goddess. The Age noted that Chances became "notorious" because of these campy elements, and while the radical changes provoked publicity, ratings did not improve. Eventually the show was moved to a late-night 11pm slot and the cast was reduced even further before the show was cancelled. In the finale, God made an appearance, speaking to Alex in the Melbourne library.

Cast

Original cast members

 John Sheerin as Dan Taylor (episodes 1–110)
 Tim Robertson as Jack Taylor (episodes 1–90)
 Brenda Addie as Barbara Taylor (episodes 1–111)
 Anne Grigg as Sarah Taylor (episodes 1–60)
 Michael Caton as Bill Anderson 
 Jeremy Sims as Alex Taylor 
 Deborah Kennedy as Connie Reynolds (episodes 1–60, recurring episodes 61–68)
 Yvonne Lawley as Heather "Hetty" McGlashen (episodes 1–52)

 Natalie McCurry as Rebecca Taylor (episodes 1–70)
 Mercia Deane-Johns as Sharon Taylor 
 Leverne McDonnell as Phillipa Taylor (episodes 1–60)
 Rhys Muldoon as Ben Taylor (episodes 1–70)
 Mark Kounnas as Chris Reynolds (episodes 1–60, recurring episodes 61–68)
 Cathy Godbold as Nicki Taylor (episodes 1–71)
 Simon Grey as Sam Reynolds (episodes 1–60, recurring episodes 61–68)

Later additions
 Kimberley Davenport as Charlie Gibson (episodes 4–60)
 Patsy Stephen as Angela Sullivan (recurring episodes 2–60, main cast 61–127) 
 Molly Brumm as Stephanie Ryan (episodes 70–90)
 Gerard Sont and John Atkinson as Cal Lawrence (episodes 79–127, recast from episode 115)
 Karen Richards as Madeline Wolf (episodes 88–127)
 Stephen Whittaker as Sven Loader (guest episode 63) and Sean Becker (episodes 92–127)
 Abigail as Bambi Chute (episodes 89–113)
 Katherine Li as Lilli Lo (recurring episodes 90–114, main cast 115–127)
 Lawrence Mah as Japanese Man (guest episode 64) and Bogart Lo (recurring episodes 89–114, main cast 115–127) 
 Danielle Fairclough as Wanda Starcross (recurring episodes 97–114, main cast 115–127)

Impact and reception

Awards and nominations
At the APRA Music Awards of 1991, the theme song for Chances, performed by Greg Hind, won Television or Film Theme of the Year.

At the 1992 Logie Awards, actor Jeremy Sims was nominated for Most Popular New Talent for his role in Chances, but lost out to Kym Wilson for her roles in both A Country Practice and the mini-series, Brides of Christ. At the time, both Sims and Wilson were in a highly publicised relationship which lasted several years.

International broadcasts
A year after its Australian debut on 4 March 1992,Chances began airing in the United Kingdom on Sky One 9pm Wednesdays and Thursdays. Like in Australia, Sky's promotion of the show centred heavily on the sexual aspects of the show, although it failed to achieve high ratings as with Studs and E Street When the show reached episode 61, Chances moved to Thursday nights at 10pm until mid-1993. Both the original and 1995 late-night repeat run ended at episode 107, as Sky One never purchased the last block of 19 episodes, possibly due to their controversial content.

Chances was also shown on Russian television. However, the series was taken off the air after members of the Russian Orthodox Church objected to a scene showing a naked woman saluting a swastika.

The show was screened on Channel 2 in New Zealand for nearly a year, but was moved to a later timeslot, and eventually dropped due to low ratings.

Bayonas also tried to sell Chances to American broadcasters, however the only interested network was the Playboy Channel, which Bayonas declined.

Home media
Chances was first released on DVD by Umbrella Entertainment in three 2-disc volumes, which focused entirely on the show's later, more fantastical era. In 2021, ViaVision Entertainment released the entire series in two collections, the first across 16 discs, the second across 17.

Episode discrepancy
As detailed in ViaVision Entertainment's DVD release, there was no "episode 78" produced, thought to have been accidentally skipped over in error. The 77th episode marked the end of a production block, with the next block resuming from "episode 79". This led to all subsequent episodes to be numbered incorrectly, with the final 126th episode being listed as "episode 127".

References

External links
 
 Aussie Soap Archive: Chances
Chances at the National Film and Sound Archive

1991 Australian television series debuts
1992 Australian television series endings
Australian television soap operas
Erotic television series
Nine Network original programming
APRA Award winners
English-language television shows
Television series by Beyond Television Productions